{{Speciesbox
| image = Saritaea magnifica.jpg
| taxon = Bignonia magnifica
| authority = W.Bull
| synonyms = 
Arrabidaea magnifica (W.Bull) Sprague ex Steenis
Saritaea magnifica (W.Bull) Dugand
| synonyms_ref = 
}}Bignonia magnifica, known as glowvine, is a species in the trumpet-vine family, Bignoniaceae. Originally described in the genus Bignonia in 1879, it was later transferred to the monotypic genus Saritaea as the sole species Saritaea magnifica, but has since been restored to Bignonia. It is native to Panama and northern South America (Colombia, Ecuador and Venezuela), but has been introduced elsewhere.

Description
The stems are almost round in cross-section, and are marked with longitudinal stripes. The 10 cm leaves have two leaflets and a further two leaflet-like appendages at the base of the leaf stalk, plus a tendril at the tip. The leaves are smooth and leathery. The plant is a very spectacular flowering, evergreen tropical climber. The large heads of showy rosy mauve to purple coloured, bell-shaped flowers 8 cm long with hairy yellow throat, borne at the end of the branches often display all year-round. When in flower it is regarded as one of the outstanding climbers of the world. Their nectar is collected by the male bees of the tropical genus Euglossa'', which pollinate the flowers by brushing against the pollen and transferring it. The fruit is a long, flattened capsule containing two-winged seeds.

Cultivation
The plant needs a warm-subtropical or tropical climate to be seen at its best, as well as well-drained moisture-retaining soil with much humus. Propagated from seed and cuttings.

References 

 Ellison, Don (1999) Cultivated Plants of the World. London: New Holland (1st ed.: Brisbane: Flora Publications International, 1995) 
 Graf, Alfred Byrd (1986) Tropica: color cyclopedia of exotic plants and trees for warm-region horticulture—in cool climate the summer garden or sheltered indoors; 3rd ed. East Rutherford, N.J.: Roehrs Co
 Lord, Tony (2003) Flora : The Gardener's Bible : More than 20,000 garden plants from around the world. London: Cassell.  
 Botanica Sistematica

magnifica
Flora of Colombia
Flora of Ecuador
Flora of Panama
Flora of Venezuela
Plants described in 1879